The Maryland Junior College Athletic Conference (MD JUCO) is a sports association for junior colleges in the National Junior College Athletic Association (NJCAA). It belongs to Region XX (20) of the NJCAA. Chartered in the late 1960s, the MD JUCO is composed of 16 community colleges in the U.S. State of Maryland.

Members

Sports
MD JUCO offers 17 sports, 8 men's and 9 women's.

Awards
MD JUCO offers two program awards, The Presidents' Cup and The Sportsmanship Award.

The Presidents’ Cup is a points based award. A school will earn points based on its final standings in a sport, with first place earning the most points, and the number of points earned being relative to the number of schools sponsoring the sport. The school with the most points at the end of the school year wins the cup. As of the 2010-11 season, the cup is awarded to men's and women's sports separately.

The Sportsmanship Award is awarded to the school with the best sportsmanship at the end of each school year. The recipient is elected by representatives from each school.

MD JUCO has two academic awards, The Student-Athlete of the Month Award, which is given to an individual man and woman athlete each month, and the MD JUCO All-Academic Team, in which student-athletes with a GPA of over 3.6 are elected too.

MD JUCO has two All-MD JUCO teams (first team and second team) for individual athletes in each sport.

Championship
MD JUCO schools can qualify to compete in the NJCAA Region 20 tournament and championship for each respective sport. MD JUCO teams also face off against their fellow Region XX conference, the Pennsylvania Collegiate Athletic Association in the tournament.

Once a team wins the regional tournament, they go on to the NJCAA national tournament. Schools from MD JUCO have won a total of 26 national championships.

See also
Western Pennsylvania Collegiate Conference, also in Region 20 of NJCAA

References

External links

NJCAA Region 20 website
NJCAA Website

NJCAA conferences